South Effingham High School is one of two public high schools located in Effingham County, Georgia, northwest of Savannah. The school was created in 1996 when Effingham County High School was split.

The school is known for its excellent academic programs, award-winning band program, and successful athletic programs.  In the 2009-2010 school year, they won the annual football game against Effingham County High School. This game is always important because of the ongoing rivalry between the two schools since the split.

The current principal is Dr. Torian White, who took over in 2019. He is the first principal of South Effingham who is also a graduate of the school, graduating in the class of 1999.

Josh Reddick was a starter for  player for the Stangs baseball team before getting drafted by the Boston Red Sox in the 17th Round of the 2006 Major League Baseball Draft.

Former principals
Dr. Franklin Goldwire (1996–2003)
W. Lang Brannen (2003–2007)
Charlie Bannister (interim) (2007)
Dan Noel (2007–2009)
Dr. Mark Winters (2009-2019)
Dr. Torian White (2019–present)

References

External links
South Effingham High School

Public high schools in Georgia (U.S. state)
Schools in Effingham County, Georgia
Educational institutions established in 1996
1996 establishments in Georgia (U.S. state)